Julio César Moreyra (born 10 August 1981) was an Argentine footballer.

Career
Moreyra finished his playing career in the regionalized Torneo Federal C with Colón de Colonia Caroya.

Honours

Player
Universidad de Chile
 Primera División de Chile Runner-up (2): 2005–C, 2006–A

References

External links
 
 

1981 births
Living people
Argentine footballers
Argentine expatriate footballers
Quilmes Atlético Club footballers
Godoy Cruz Antonio Tomba footballers
Instituto footballers
Independiente Rivadavia footballers
Club Blooming players
Club Deportivo Universidad de San Martín de Porres players
Universidad de Chile footballers
Expatriate footballers in Chile
Expatriate footballers in Peru
Expatriate footballers in Bolivia
Argentine expatriate sportspeople in Bolivia
Association football defenders
Footballers from Córdoba, Argentina
Argentine expatriate sportspeople in Peru
Argentine expatriate sportspeople in Chile
21st-century Argentine people